Damayanti (Hindi : दमयंती) or Dayamanthi is a Hindu/Sanskrit Indian feminine given name, which means "soothing" and "subduing".

Notable people with the given name

Damayanti 
Damayanti Beshra, Santali writer and poet 
Damayanti Joshi (1928–2004), Indian choreographer and dancer
Damayanti Tambay, wife of Flt lt V. V. Tambay, one of the missing 54 Indian defence personnel from the 1971 Indo-Pak war who are believed to be in Pakistani custody

Damayanthi
Damayanthi Dharsha (born 1975), Sri Lankan athlete who competed in the 200 and 400 metres race

See also 
(people with the surname)
Ayu Fani Damayanti (born 1988), Indonesian tennis player
Anusha Damayanthi (born 1978), Sri Lankan cinema and television actress

Others 
 Damayanti, a character in Hindu mythology, princess of Vidarbha Kingdom and King Nala of Nishadha's wife.

Hindu given names
Indian feminine given names